Vijaya Dabbe (1 June 1951 – 23 February 2018) was an Indian writer, feminist, scholar and critic in Kannada language. Often credited as the first feminist writer in modern Kannada language, Dabbe was one of the prominent figures in feminist movement in Karnataka.

Personal life
Vijaya was born on 1 June 1951 in Dabbe village of Belur taluk, to Krishnamurthy and Seethalakshmi. She finished her schooling in Kalasapura and Javagal, later moved to Hassan and Mysuru to do higher education. She served as Kannada faculty member at Mysore University.

Career
As writer
Dabbe's first noted literary work was ‛Irutthave’, a collection of poems, published in 1975. Her other important works including ‛Neeru Lohada Chinte’ (1985) and ’Naari Daari Digantha’ and so on. Most of her works are women centric.

 Feminist movement 
Vijaya Dabbe was one of the founders of ‛Samatha Vedike’, instituted in 1978, a group of women writers and activists who have been working to spread awareness about gender equality, family atrocities on women, dowry, child marriage, other caste based discrimination and social injustice for the depressed classes, especially women. Dabbe was the front face in leading these activities through her poems, articles, workshops, literary meetings and social works all over Karnataka.

Literary works
Poetry
 Irutthave (1975)
 Neeru Lohada Chinte(1985)
 Ithigeethike (1995)
 Tirugi Nintha Prashne (1995)

Research 
 Nagachandra - Ondu Adhyayana (1983)
 Nayasena
 Hithaishiya Hejjegalu (1992)
 Saarasaraswathi (1996)
 Hithophia Hejjegalu 

Travelogue 
 Uriya Chigura Uthkale (1999)

Criticism
 Mahila Sahitya Samaja (1986)
 Naari Daari Digantha (1996)
 Mahila mattu Maanavate
 Samprati (1977)

Translation
 Meri Mekliyath Bethone
 Vimochaneyedege (with B. N. Sumitrabai, 1986)
 Gurujaada (1986)

Awards
 2008 - Rajyotsava Prashasti by Government of Karnataka
 2008 - Daana Chintamani Attimabbe Award by Government of Karnataka
 Anumapama Award by Karnataka Lekhakiyara Sangha
 ‛Vardhamana Award’

Death
Vijaya Dabbe became inactive after she met with a road accident on 6 January in 1999. She died in Mysuru on 23 February 2018, due to cardiac arrest.

References

Kannada poets
Kannada people
People from Hassan district
People from Karnataka
21st-century Indian writers
Kannada-language writers
Women writers from Karnataka
1951 births
2018 deaths
Indian feminist writers
Indian feminists